Paul Chanel Malenfant (born 1960) is a Québécois writer and professor. He won Canada's Governor General's Award in 2001.

Life
He graduated from the Université de Montréal and the Université Laval.

He was a professor at Cégep de Rimouski and then l'Université du Québec à Rimouski until 1982.

Works 
 Poèmes de la mer pays, Hurtubise HMH, 1972, 
 Forges froides, Quinze, 1977, 
 Le mot à mot, Le Noroît, 1982, 
 Les Noms du père, Le Noroît, 1985
 En tout état de corps, Écrits des Forges, 1985
 Coqs à deux têtes, NBJ, 1987
 Tirer au clair, Le Noroît, 1988
 Le Siècle inachevé, Éditeq, 1989
 La Table des matières, Le Noroît, 1990
 Voix transitoires, Le Noroît, 1992
 Le verbe être, L’Hexagone, 1993, 
 Hommes de profil, Écrits des Forges, 1994
 Fleuves, Le Noroît, 1997
 Quoi, déjà la nuit?, L’Hexagone, 1998
 Des airs de famille, L’Hexagone, 2000
 Des ombres portées, Le Noroît, 2001
 Vivre ainsi, Le Noroît, 2005
 '  
 Rue Daubenton, L’Hexagone, 2007, 
 Tombeaux, L’Hexagone, 2010
 La petite mariée de Chagall, 2012
 D'un genre, l'autre? , Le Noroît, 2015
 Toujours Jamais, Éditions de l'Hexagone, 2014, 
Works in English
If this Were Death, Translator Marylea MacDonald, Guernica Editions, 2009,

Honors 
 1983 - Prix du Salon du livre de Rimouski (plus tard renommé Prix Jovette-Bernier)
 1985 - Finaliste au Prix du Gouverneur général, Les noms du père, suivi de Lieux dits: Italique
 1989 - Prix littéraire des Associés
 1994 - Finaliste au Prix du Gouverneur général, Hommes de profil
 1997 - Finaliste au Prix du Gouverneur général, Fleuves
 1998 - Prix littéraires Radio-Canada
 1998 - Prix Alain-Grandbois 
 1998 - Grand Prix du Festival international de la poésie, Fleuves 
 2001 - Prix du Gouverneur général, Des ombres portées
 2003 - Finaliste au Prix du Gouverneur général, Si tu allais quelque part

References

External links

Archives of Paul Chanel Malenfant (Fonds Paul Chanel Malenfant, R16317) sont conservées à Library and Archives Canada 

Prix Alain-Grandbois
1950 births
Writers from Quebec
Living people
Canadian male poets
20th-century Canadian poets
20th-century Canadian male writers
21st-century Canadian poets
Canadian poets in French
Governor General's Award-winning poets
21st-century Canadian male writers
Université Laval alumni